Lyces angulosa is a moth of the  family Notodontidae. It is endemic to the Atlantic coastal forest of Brazil.

References

External links
Species page at Tree of Life project

Notodontidae of South America
Endemic fauna of Brazil
Moths described in 1854